Ron Fisher (born July 22, 1934) is a Canadian former politician. He represented the electoral district of Saskatoon—Dundurn in the House of Commons of Canada from 1988 to 1993 as a member of the New Democratic Party.

External links
 

1934 births
Living people
Members of the House of Commons of Canada from Saskatchewan
New Democratic Party MPs
People from Wadena, Saskatchewan